Edgar Winter's White Trash is the second studio album by Edgar Winter, and his first with his group White Trash. The album reached #111 on the Billboard charts, and produced the single "Keep Playin' That Rock 'n' Roll", which went to #70 on Billboard's Top 100. The album was prepped for quadraphonic sound, but was left unreleased in this format. The album was produced by Rick Derringer. In Canada, the album reached #82. The track "Dying to Live" is sampled in 2Pac's posthumous release Runnin' (Dying to Live).

Track listing

Personnel

Edgar Winter – organ, piano, celeste, keyboards, saxophone, vocals
Rick Derringer – guitar, vocals, producer
Johnny Winter – guitar, harmonica, vocals
Floyd Radford – guitar
George Sheck – bass guitar
Jerry Lacroix – harmonica, saxophone, vocals
Jon Smith – tenor saxophone, vocals
Tilly Lawrence - lead trumpet, vocals
Mike McClellan – trumpet, vocals
Bobby Ramirez – drums
Steven Paul – organic director
Ray Barretto – conductor, congas
Alfred Brown – strings
Arnold Eidus – strings
George Ricci – strings
Gene Orloff – strings
Emanuel Green – strings
Max Pollikoff – strings
Russell Savkas – strings
Eileen Gilbert – conductor, vocals
Carl Hull – vocals
Albertine Robinson – vocals
Tasha Thomas – vocals
Janice Bell – vocals
Maretha Stewart – vocals
Patti Smith – poetry
Lou Waxman – engineer
Peter Weiss – engineer
Richard Mantel – design
Alen MacWeeney – photography
Robert Honablue – mastering

References

External links
 

1971 albums
Edgar Winter albums
Epic Records albums
Albums produced by Rick Derringer
Albums conducted by Ray Barretto